This page are listed the results of all of the Rio Carnival on year 2012. In that year the LESGA was relieved by RioTur. due disrespecting the regulation of the parade of Grupo de acesso that before the counting was defined that none of the school would be demoted. Due to lack of passthrough of money the time of parades and the uncertainties as to the location of the barracks of schools that have been evicted from Carandiru. Soon after this Carnival LIERJ was created, whose unified groups A and B, pra form the Serie A.

Grupo Especial

Grupo A

Grupo B

Grupo C

Grupo D

Grupo E

References 

2012